The 2000–01 season was the 90th season in existence of Torino Calcio and the club's first season back in the second division of Italian football. In addition to the domestic league, Torino participated in this season's edition of the Coppa Italia. The season covered the period from 1 July 2000 to 30 June 2001.

In 2000-2001, Torino had Kelme as technical sponsor, while the main sponsor was Directa.

Pre-season and friendlies

Competitions

Overview

Serie B

League table

Results summary

Results by round

Matches

Source:

Coppa Italia

Group stage

Round of 32

Round of 16

References

External links

Torino F.C. seasons
Torino